William Samuel Calvert (March 3, 1859 – February 22, 1930) was a Canadian politician.

Born in Township of Warwick, Lambton County, Canada West, Calvert was educated at the Public School of Warwick and at Watford Seminary. A manufacturer, he was Reeve of Metcalfe and Warden of Middlesex. He was first elected to the House of Commons of Canada for the electoral district of Middlesex West in the general elections of 1896. A Liberal, he was re-elected in 1900, 1904 and 1908. He resigned in 1909 when he was appointed member of the National Transcontinental Railway Commission. From 1901 to 1909, he was the Chief Government Whip.

References
 
 

1859 births
1930 deaths
Liberal Party of Canada MPs
Members of the House of Commons of Canada from Ontario